Demirýollary open joint-stock company  (means Railways)  is the state-owned operator of railways in Turkmenistan. The company belongs to the Ministry of Industry and Construction and is subordinate to the Railways Agency of Turkmenistan. It is headquartered in Ashgabat. While the rail system itself belongs to the railways agency, the Turkmen Railways company owns the locomotive and railcar depots, rail stations, construction and maintenance units, communications and power supply services, and two hotels in Awaza, the Kerwen and Türkmenbaşy.

History

Independent Turkmenistan 

On 29 January 2019 the Ministry of Railways was downgraded to agency status, renamed the Turkmen Railways Agency, and subordinated to the reorganized Ministry of Industry and Communications (which subsequently was again reorganized into the Ministry of Industry and Construction).

Demirýollary OJSC (from 2020) 

The open joint-stock company Demirýollary was formed as a commercial subsidiary of the Turkmen Railways Agency on 5 February 2020. Demirýollary has received the functions of a carrier in both freight and passenger traffic. President of Turkmenistan Gurbanguly Berdimuhamedov signed a decree on the transfer of functions of a railway carrier to the new structure. The founders of the new OJSC Demiryollary are the Agency Turkmendemiryollary, the Ashgabat Distance of Tracks and Structures, OJSC Türkmenistanyň Ulag-logistika merkezi and the mobile operator Altyn Asyr.   

In order to prevent infectious diseases, the movement of passenger trains in Turmkenistan was suspended on July 16, 2020. In the spring of 2021, passenger traffic was fully restored. Passengers must have a COVID-19 negative test certificate issued no earlier than 72 hours before travel. Before boarding the train, passengers will have their temperature measured, oxolinic ointment will be applied to the nasal mucosa, and their hands will be treated with a disinfecting solution. The guides and representatives of the traffic police are obliged to monitor the observance of a distance of at least one meter, which must be adhered to by passengers, as well as the wearing of masks. Coupe tickets will only be available for 2 seats instead of 4. Conductors are obliged to disinfect the cars 6 hours before the train departs, after arriving at the destination and every 3-4 hours during the movement of trains.

Activities 
The main activities of Demirýollary involve freight and passenger traffic. The company annually serves almost 6 million passengers. The passenger department employs 5,000 specialists out of a total staff profile of about 15,000.

Sale of railway passenger tickets is carried out also via the Internet and a mobile application for Android and iOS. The online ticketing service in Turkmenistan was launched on June 1, 2019.

Rolling stock 
The Asian Development Bank reported in 2021,In 2019, [Turkmen Railway Agency] had a rolling stock fleet of 119 diesel locomotives, 10,056 freight wagons, and 425 passenger cars. The majority of locomotives and all the passenger cars were purchased from the PRC (25 CKD9A-series passenger locomotives and 83 CKD9C-series freight locomotives). The freight wagon fleet included 2,849 tanker wagons, 1,738 gondola wagons, 1,637 platform wagons, 1,358 closed hopper wagons, 1,143 box wagons and 654 refrigerated wagons.... In 2019, 6,607 wagons (65% of the fleet) [were] at least 30 years old, with many of these wagons having exceeded their normal economic life and in need of replacement. 

In 2013, 154 passenger coaches were ordered from CSR; CSR had previously supplied locomotives.

Diesel Locomotives 
The locomotive park  consists of diesel locomotives of the 2TE10L, 2TE10U, 2M62U series, there are also several Chinese-made CKD9A, Kazakh-made TE33A, Russian-made 2TE25KM and TEP70BS locomotives. Shunting work is performed by diesel locomotives TEM2, TEM2U, ChME3.

Photos

Railway links with adjacent countries 
  Kazakhstan – same gauge (former Soviet Union railway system) – new rail link opened in 2013.
  Iran-open-break-of-gauge..

Headquarters
Türkmenistan, Aşgabat ş., Türkmenbaşy şaýoly, jaý 7

See also 
 Railways Agency of Turkmenistan
 Rail transport in Turkmenistan
 Transport in Turkmenistan
 Trans-Karakum Railway
 Trans-Caspian railway
 North-South Transnational Railway Corridor

References

External links 
 Türkmendemirýollary official website
 Turkmenistan Railways app for Android
 Turkmenistan Railways for iOS

Rail transport in Turkmenistan
Government-owned companies of Turkmenistan
Railway companies of Turkmenistan
Companies based in Ashgabat